José Luis Navarro (born 28 July 1962) is a Spanish former professional racing cyclist. He rode in one edition of the Tour de France, one edition of the Giro d'Italia and seven editions of the Vuelta a España. He won the mountains classification of the 1985 Giro d'Italia.

Major results

1982
 3rd Overall Volta a Lleida
 3rd Overall Vuelta a Burgos
1984
 1st Klasika Primavera
 1st Mémorial Manuel Galera
1985
 1st  Road race, National Road Championships
 1st  Mountains classification, Giro d'Italia
 1st Stage 3 Tirreno–Adriatico
 1st Stage 6 Vuelta a Asturias
 1st Stage 3 Ruota d'Oro
 10th Overall Vuelta a España
1986
 1st Six Days of Madrid (with Gerrie Knetemann)

References

External links

1962 births
Living people
Spanish male cyclists
Cyclists from Madrid